Pi Mu Epsilon ( or ) is the U.S. honorary national mathematics society.

Goals
Pi Mu Epsilon is dedicated to the promotion of mathematics and recognition of students who successfully pursue mathematical understanding. To promote mathematics, the National Pi Mu Epsilon Council co-sponsors an annual conference in conjunction with the Mathematical Association of America.

The society also publishes a semi-annual journal, the Pi Mu Epsilon Journal, which both presents research papers particularly focusing on student authored papers, as well as a problem section.
The Richard V. Andree Awards are given by the organization to undergraduates whose articles in the Journal have been judged as containing the best content for the year. Andree served as the editor of the journal, as well as President and Secretary-Treasurer of the organization.

Membership
A person meeting any one of the following four sets of qualifications may be elected to membership by a chapter. This election shall be irrespective of sex, religion, race, or national origin:

Undergraduate students who have completed at least the equivalent of two semesters of calculus and two additional courses in mathematics, at or above the calculus level, all of which lead to the fulfillment of the requirements for a major in the mathematical sciences. In addition, such students must have maintained a grade point average equivalent to that of at least 3.0 on a 4-point scale, both for all courses that lead to fulfillment of requirements for a major in the mathematical sciences, and also for all courses that lead to fulfillment of requirements for an undergraduate degree.
Graduate students whose mathematical work is at least equivalent to that required of qualified undergraduates, and who have maintained at least a B average in mathematics during their last school year prior to their election.
Members of the faculty in mathematics or related subjects.
Any person who has some special distinction in mathematics (e.g. major math publication of importance, Putnam competition winners).

See also 
 Kappa Mu Epsilon,  (mathematics)
 Mu Alpha Theta,  (mathematics, high school)
 Mu Sigma Rho,  (statistics)
 Professional fraternities and sororities

References

Honor societies
Mathematical societies
Student organizations established in 1914
Student societies in the United States
1914 establishments in New York (state)